The 2006 Penn State Nittany Lions football team represented the Pennsylvania State University in the 2006 NCAA Division I FBS football season. The team's head coach was Joe Paterno. It played its home games at Beaver Stadium in University Park, Pennsylvania.

Previous season

Penn State had unexpected success in 2005, following two consecutive losing seasons. Beginning the season unranked in any poll, the team finished 11–1 and ranked third. With only one loss, the team was Big Ten co-champions with Ohio State. Linebacker Paul Posluszny won both the Chuck Bednarik and Dick Butkus Awards, and was a consensus All-American. Quarterback Michael Robinson finished fifth in the Heisman Trophy voting.

Preseason
The team had key losses due to graduation, including Michael Robinson, Tamba Hali, Alan Zemaitis, Anwar Phillips, Calvin Lowry, and Ethan Kilmer. Paul Posluszny and offensive tackle Levi Brown decided to return to the team for the 2006 season, despite speculation both players would enter the NFL Draft. Posluszny and star receiver Derrick Williams returned from injuries that caused them to miss time in 2005.

Paul Posluszny and Levi Brown were elected co-captains of the football team for 2006. Posluszny becomes the team's first two-time captain since 1969. Posluszny was also named the 2006 Big Ten and consensus national pre-season Defensive Player of the Year.

Penn State was ranked No. 19 in both the AP and Coaches college football preseason polls.

Recruiting class

Schedule
Penn State did not play Big Ten teams Indiana and Iowa this year.

Personnel

Roster

Coaching staff

 Joe Paterno – Head Coach
 Dick Anderson – Offensive Line (Guards and Centers)
 Tom Bradley – Defensive Coordinator and Cornerbacks
 Galen Hall – Offensive Coordinator and Running Backs
 Larry Johnson, Sr. – Defensive Line
 Bill Kenney – Offensive Tackles and Tight Ends
 Mike McQueary – Wide Receivers and Recruiting Coordinator
 Brian Norwood – Safeties
 Jay Paterno – Quarterbacks
 Ron Vanderlinden – Linebackers
 John Thomas – Strength and Conditioning

Game summaries

September 2: Akron

Penn State played the Akron Zips in its home opener. Akron was unranked, however the team finished as the 2005 MAC Champions. Anthony Morelli threw a 42-yard touchdown on his first pass attempt of his first start. Penn State won the game 34–16. Akron kept it respectably close for a while before Penn State pulled away with a commanding 34–9 lead, allowing a late Zips touchdown to once again make it look respectable.

September 9: Notre Dame

Penn State played the Notre Dame Fighting Irish in South Bend, Indiana. After a close first quarter, Notre Dame pulled away from the young Penn State squad to win 41–17.

September 16: Youngstown State

Penn State defeated the Youngstown State Penguins by a score of 37–3 on September 16, 2006 at Beaver Stadium.

The Youngstown State Penguins were the 150th different team to face Penn State since 1887, the first year for Penn State football.

September 23: Ohio State

Penn State lost to the number one ranked Ohio State Buckeyes in Columbus, Ohio on September 23, 2006, by the score of 28–6 in a game closer than the final score would indicate. Despite the score, Penn State led in many statistical areas, such as first downs, controlling the clock, and total yards, but only had six points to show for their dominating effort. After a scoreless first half, in which the Nittany Lions messed up a chance to score an early touchdown because fullback Matt Hahn broke loose, but was tackled near the goal line and fumbled before the ball crossed the plane. However, Penn State scored a field goal right before halftime after putting together their second long drive of the first half. Penn State led 3–0 at halftime, and controlled the tempo in much of the second half, despite the Buckeyes going up 7–3 following a missed Penn State field goal. Early in the fourth quarter, Troy Smith threw the football away, down the field to avoid a sack in a tipped, nearly intercepted, up for grabs pass that happened to be caught for a touchdown by Brian Robiskie. The Nittany Lions, still playing like they were in control of the game, responded with a strong drive that was called back at the 1 yard line for a false start. The Nittany Lions had to settle for a field goal, which helped shift the momentum to the Buckeyes, but Penn State would gain a full head of steam late in the game. The score was 14–6 in favor of the Buckeyes and Penn State was driving downfield with less than three minutes left. As Penn State led another potentially scoring drive far down the field, hoping to tie the game up at 14–14, it was intercepted and returned for a touchdown with roughly 2 minutes left on the clock. However, Malcolm Jenkins spiked the ball at the one yard line, which rolled into the endzone untouched. This was only noticed after the game. Antonio Smith returned another interception to clinch the victory with 1:07 remaining on the clock, this time from midfield. As ESPN had said, this allowed the Buckeyes to make the victory look easy when, in fact, it was a hard-fought victory, some Penn State fans feel that the Nittany Lions were the better team and should have won that contest, failing to realize that the mistakes that they made, even if it was "handing the game over on a silver platter", are as much a part of football as any other element, which is why a defense that can force turnovers is so highly regarded.

September 30: Northwestern

Penn State defeated the Northwestern Wildcats 33–7 on September 30, 2006 at Beaver Stadium. Deon Butler set a Penn State record with 216 receiving yards, breaking O.J. McDuffie's record of 202 yards set against Boston College in 1992. Tony Hunt ran for 137 yards and three touchdowns. Anthony Morelli completed 19-of-33 passes for 288 yards.

October 7: Minnesota

Penn State defeated the Minnesota Golden Gophers 28–27 in overtime. Tony Hunt rushed for 144 yards and three touchdowns (2 rushing), the last in overtime for the game-winning touchdown. Anthony Morelli threw for 281 yards and two touchdowns despite playing with a dislocated ring finger on his left (non-throwing) hand. The game, tied at overtime, was decided by two factors, a missed extra point kick, and a pass interference penalty on Penn State's drive to give them a fresh set of downs. Both proved critical, as Penn State soon converted the touchdown and kicked the extra point to escape with the win.

October 14: Michigan

Michigan's defensive front seven was the story of the game, collecting seven sacks and holding the Nittany Lions to −14 net rushing yards. On a third-quarter pass play, Alan Branch knocked Penn State's quarterback Anthony Morelli out of the game with a concussion; Penn State's backup quarterback Daryl Clark was later injured on a rushing attempt. Third-string quarterback Paul Cianciolo managed to throw the Nittany Lions' only touchdown pass of the game. The game was a homecoming for Pennsylvania native Henne, who played the only game of his career at Penn State. With Manningham not playing due to a knee injury suffered against Michigan State, Arrington and Breaston caught the bulk of Henne's passes, each collecting five receptions. Hart picked up his sixth 100-yard rushing game of the season and scored the winning touchdown

October 21: Illinois

Carried mostly by the play of its defense, Penn State defeated the Illinois Fighting Illini 26–12 during homecoming weekend. Strong safety Anthony Scirrotto had two interceptions and returned an attempted onside kick for a touchdown.

Punter Jeremy Kapinos was named Big Ten Special Teams Player of the Week for the second time this season, averaging 45.6 yards per punt, with a long of 57 yards. He pinned Illinois inside its own 20 yard line four times. He also surpassed Ralph Giacomarro to become first all-time in career punting yardage (9,578). Linebacker Paul Posluszny was also named the Big Ten Defensive Player of the Week, notching a season-high 13 tackles and forced a fumble that was returned for a touchdown.

October 28: Purdue

Penn State's low-scoring win on the road against the Boilermakers saw running back Tony Hunt rush 31 times for 142 yards and a touchdown (along with 2 receptions for 36 yards) as the Nittany Lions posted a shutout against Purdue, their first ever under head coach Joe Tiller. The low score was primarily a result of the high winds and cold weather. It was Penn State's first shutout since a 49–0 win over the Northwestern Wildcats in October 2002.

Recording a game-high 12 tackles and an interception, linebacker Dan Connor was named Big Ten Defensive Player of the Week.

November 4: Wisconsin

Penn State suffered a 13–3 loss on the road versus the Wisconsin Badgers. Wisconsin kicker Taylor Mehlhaff put the Badgers on the scoreboard first with a 37-yard field goal in the first quarter. In the second quarter, Penn State kicker Kevin Kelly tied the score with a 39-yard field goal, but Badgers quarterback John Stocco countered with 14-yard touchdown pass to Paul Hubbard. Wisconsin added a 20-yard field goal in the third quarter. With the long-held ten point lead, the Badgers were the only Big Ten team that Penn State lost to that they had not played completely down to the wire. In both games, they had late chances to win the game, but in this game, again a stubborn defensive struggle, Penn State was unable to kick a second field goal that would have at least made it interesting late.

Recording 14 tackles, linebacker Paul Posluszny broke Greg Buttle's record for career tackles. Posluszny finished the game with 349 career tackles in a game where Penn State's defense did their part to hold Wisconsin to few yardage and points.

Penn State head coach Joe Paterno was injured during a sideline collision in the third quarter. Although reluctant to leave the sideline, he was taken to the locker room for evaluation and flown back to Penn State ahead of the team. There it was revealed that Paterno had a pair of fractures to his tibia along with tears of his anterior cruciate and medial collateral ligaments.

November 11: Temple

Running back Tony Hunt had a career day, scoring 4 touchdowns and rushing for 167 yards in two and a half quarters of play, as Penn State shut out the Temple Owls 47–0 with coach Joe Paterno absent from the sidelines for the first time since 1977. Derrick Williams scored on a 75-yard punt return, while placekicker Kevin Kelly added field goals of 19 and 33 yards. Reserve quarterback Daryll Clark scored on a 4th quarter run. Following the game, Penn State captains Levi Brown and Paul Posluszny visited Paterno at his home to present him with the game ball.

The game was the first in Happy Valley for former Nittany Lion tight end Al Golden as Temple head coach.

November 18: Michigan State

23 seniors helped close out their regular season careers as Nittany Lions by winning the Land Grant Trophy with a 17–13 win over the Michigan State Spartans. Coach Joe Paterno, still nursing a broken shinbone, coached from the pressbox. Running back Tony Hunt overcame 2 first quarter fumbles to tally his seventh 100-yard game this season, rushing for 129 yards on 29 attempts. Quarterback Anthony Morelli, who also had 2 fumbles, finished 17-of-37 for 220 yards.

January 1: 2007 Outback Bowl – Tennessee

The 2007 Outback Bowl featured Penn State against the Tennessee Volunteers of the SEC. Penn State last participated in the game in 1999, when they won over the Kentucky Wildcats by the score of 26–14. Tennessee last played in Tampa in the 1993 Hall of Fame Bowl, defeating the Boston College Eagles 38–23. Before this game, Penn State's last game versus Tennessee was the 1994 Florida Citrus Bowl where they crushed the heavily favored Volunteers in an easy 31–13 victory.

Penn State defeated the favored Tennessee 20–10 for Joe Paterno's record 22nd bowl win. Tony Hunt led the PSU offense running for 158 yards on 31 carries. Tony Davis returned a fumble 88 yards for the game-winning touchdown. First Team All-Big Ten Conference strong safety Anthony Scirrotto also recorded his sixth interception of the season. The key play of the game was a fumble recovery returned for a touchdown early in the fourth quarter. Late in the fourth, Penn State ran down the clock, but despite stalling in the red zone, kicked a field goal that put the game out of reach.

Rankings

Awards

Watchlists

 Levi Brown
Lombardi Award watchlist
Outland Trophy watchlist
 Dan Connor
Chuck Bednarik Award watchlist
Dick Butkus Award watchlist
 Tony Hunt
Doak Walker Award watchlist
 Jeremy Kapinos
Ray Guy Award watchlist
 Paul Posluszny
Bronko Nagurski Trophy watchlist
Chuck Bednarik Award watchlist
Lindy's Football Heisman Trophy watchlist
Lombardi Award watchlist
Dick Butkus Award watchlist
Draddy Trophy semifinalist and finalist
Lott Trophy watchlist
Walter Camp Player of the Year watchlist
 Tim Shaw
Chuck Bednarik Award watchlist
 Derrick Williams
Maxwell Award watchlist

Players

 Jay Alford
Third-team Associated Press All-American
Second-team All-Big Ten (conference coaches selection)
 Levi Brown
Second-team Walter Camp All-American
Second-team Sporting News All-American
Third-team Associated Press All-American
Second-team All-Big Ten
 Gerald Cadogan
ESPN The Magazine CoSIDA Academic All-District
 Dan Connor
First-team Sporting News All-American
Second-team Associated Press All-American
Second-team All-Big Ten
Big Ten Defensive Player of the Week (Sep. 2)
Big Ten Defensive Player of the Week (Oct. 28)
 Maurice Evans
Sporting News Big Ten All-Freshman Team
 Tony Hunt
Second-team All-Big Ten
Big Ten Offensive Player of the Week (Nov. 11)
Most Valuable Player, 2007 Outback Bowl
Most Valuable Player, 2007 Senior Bowl
 Jeremy Kapinos
Third-team Associated Press All-American
Second-team All-Big Ten
Big Ten Special Teams Player of the Week (Sep. 23)
Big Ten Special Teams Player of the Week (Oct. 21)
 Justin King
Second-team All-Big Ten (conference coaches selection)
 Nolan McCready
ESPN The Magazine CoSIDA Academic All-District
Second-team ESPN The Magazine CoSIDA Academic All-American
 Paul Posluszny
2006 Bednarik Award winner
ESPN The Magazine CoSIDA Academic All-District
First-team ESPN The Magazine CoSIDA Academic All-American
ESPN The Magazine CoSIDA Academic All-American of the Year
First-team Associated Press All-American
First-team Walter Camp All-American
First-team All-Big Ten
Second-team Sporting News All-American
Big Ten Defensive Player of the Week (Oct. 21)
National Football Foundation Scholar-Athlete fellowship
NCAA Defensive Player of the Year
 Andrew Quarless
Sporting News Big Ten All-Freshman Team
 Anthony Scirrotto
First-team All-Big Ten (conference media selection)
ESPN.com All-Bowl Team
 Tim Shaw
ESPN The Magazine CoSIDA Academic All-District
First-team ESPN The Magazine CoSIDA Academic All-American

Post season
Penn State finished the season ranked number 24 in the final AP college football poll and number 25 in the final USA Today college football poll, earning Penn State its 32nd Top 25 finish under Joe Paterno.

The team's success helped Penn State finish second in football attendance for the fourth time this decade and in the top four for the 16th consecutive year, averaging 107,567 for seven home games, including a crowd of 110,007 on October 14 to watch Penn State host Michigan in primetime, the second-largest in Beaver Stadium history. Penn State finished the season with a sellout crowd of 65,601 at the Outback Bowl.

Five players participated in the NFL Scouting Combine, held February 22–27 in Indianapolis, IN: Jay Alford, Levi Brown, Tony Hunt, Paul Posluszny, and Tim Shaw.

NFL draft
Five Penn State players were selected in the 2007 NFL Draft.

All-star games

References

Penn State
Penn State Nittany Lions football seasons
ReliaQuest Bowl champion seasons
Penn State Nittany Lions football